Semenova Gora is a rural locality (a village) in Nyuksenskoye Rural Settlement, Nyuksensky District, Vologda Oblast, Russia. The population was 14 as of 2002.

Geography 
Semenova Gora is located 16 km northwest of Nyuksenitsa (the district's administrative centre) by road. Malchevskaya is the nearest rural locality.

References 

Rural localities in Nyuksensky District